The Slovenian Supercup 1995 was a football match that saw the 1994–95 PrvaLiga champions, Olimpija, face off against Slovenian Cup winners, Mura. The match was held on 26 July 1995 at the Bežigrad Stadium in Ljubljana.

Match details

See also
1994–95 Slovenian PrvaLiga
1994–95 Slovenian Football Cup

Slovenian Supercup
Supercup